Raikabagh Palace Junction railway station is a railway station on the North Western Railways network in the state of Rajasthan, India. It is located approximately 2 km from Jodhpur railway station.

Platform 
The station has two platforms. Entry to platform no 1 is from Paota side.

See also
 Jodhpur district

References

External links
 

Railway stations in Jodhpur district
Jodhpur railway division